Governors Ridge is located in Mount Rainier National Park in Pierce County of Washington state. It is part of the Cascade Range and is situated west of Cayuse Pass and 1.09 mile east of Tamanos Mountain, which is its nearest higher peak. The name honors all the governors who have served the state of Washington. The highest rocky crag on the ridge is known as Governors Peak. There is also a 40-foot leaning spire known as Governors Needle, and Barrier Peak is at the southern culmination of the ridge. The normal climbing access is from the Owyhigh Lakes Trail.

Climate

Governors Ridge is located in the marine west coast climate zone of western North America. Most weather fronts originate in the Pacific Ocean, and travel northeast toward the Cascade Mountains. As fronts approach, they are forced upward by the peaks of the Cascade Range (Orographic lift), causing them to drop their moisture in the form of rain or snowfall onto the Cascades. As a result, the west side of the North Cascades experiences high precipitation, especially during the winter months in the form of snowfall. During winter months, weather is usually cloudy, but, due to high pressure systems over the Pacific Ocean that intensify during summer months, there is often little or no cloud cover during the summer. Because of maritime influence, snow tends to be wet and heavy, resulting in high avalanche danger. Precipitation runoff from Governors Ridge drains into tributaries of the White River and Cowlitz River.

References

External links

 Weather forecast: Governors Ridge
 National Park Service web site: Mount Rainier National Park

Cascade Range
Mountains of Pierce County, Washington
Mountains of Washington (state)
Mount Rainier National Park